The Provisional Central Government of Vietnam was an entity proclaimed in Vietnam during the First Indochina War. It was created as a transitional government replacing the protectorates of Tonkin (Northern Vietnam) and Annam (Central Vietnam), until Cochinchina (Southern Vietnam) could be reunited with the rest of the country.

History 

On June 5, 1948, the Halong Bay Agreements (Accords de la baie d’Along) allowed the creation of a unified Vietnamese government replacing the Tonkin (Northern Vietnam), Annam (Central Vietnam) associated to France within the French Union and the Indochinese Federation then including the neighboring Kingdom of Laos and Kingdom of Cambodia.

However, while the participants had agreed on the reunification of Cochinchina (Southern Vietnam) with Tonkin and Annam, it had a different status from the other two territories and retained a separate administration. Former Emperor Bảo Đại, whom the French wanted to bring back to power as a political alternative to Ho Chi Minh, insisted that all Vietnam should be reunited before he took office as "chief of State". General Nguyễn Văn Xuân, until then head of the Cochinchinese government, signed the agreements on Bảo Đại's behalf and became head of the newly formed Provisional Central Government; he was replaced by Trần Văn Hữu as president of the Cochinchinese administration. Although Vietnam was not yet reunited, and far from being autonomous, the French had agreed for the first time to include the word "independence" in the agreements.

During the only year of its existence, the Provisional Central Government had very limited means, and was denounced by the communist Viet Minh as a puppet state. The Xuân government was able to create several administrative units in Northern and Central Vietnam, but it was entirely dependent on the French as it initially had no army, no police forces and – being, unlike the government of Cochinchina, unable to collect taxes – no financial resources. As the Indochina war raged on, the Provisional Central Government was regarded as near-impotent. Also, the French administration was still in place in Tonkin and Annam and was often reluctant to relinquish power to the new Vietnamese administration.

Moreover, the reunification of Vietnam was still hampered by the status of Cochinchina: the French colonists – who remained influential in the Cochinchinese consultative council – insisted, with the support of Southern Vietnamese autonomist politicians, that Cochinchina (then known as the Provisional Government of Southern Vietnam) was still legally a colony, since its status as an "autonomous Republic", proclaimed in 1946, had never been ratified by the French National Assembly, and that any process of reunification had therefore to be approved by the French Parliament. Xuân tried to reunite Cochinchina with his government through a by-law, but it was overruled by the colony's council. Trần Văn Hữu's administration therefore remained in existence and Vietnam found itself with two governments, each backed by the French, one claiming sovereignty over the whole country, and one administrating the Southern region.

Gradually, the Vietnamese provisional government was given the means to establish armed forces. On 1 January 1949, the Vietnamese National Army was officially created under French supervision. It initially numbered 25,000 troops, including 10,000 irregulars.

The Vietnamese situation remained deadlocked for over a year, as Bảo Đại refused to return to Vietnam and take office as head of state until the country was fully reunited. Finally, the French National Assembly voted a law set to create a Cochinchinese territorial assembly which would replace the former council. The new assembly was elected on 10 April 1949, and the Vietnamese became a majority. On 23 April, the Cochinchinese assembly approved the merger with the Provisional Government, and its decision was in turn approved by the French National Assembly on May 20. On June 4, Cochinchina and the "associated State of Vietnam" were formally merged, and the State of Vietnam could then be officially proclaimed on July 2.

Cabinet 

 (Ex-)Emperor: Bảo Đại 
 President: Nguyễn Văn Xuân
 Vice President: Trần Văn Hữu
 Minister of Justice: Nguyễn Khắc Vệ
 Minister of Rites and Education: Nguyễn Khoa Toàn
 Minister of Economy and Finance: Nguyễn Trung Vinh
 Minister of Information, Press, and Propaganda: Phan Huy Đán
 Minister of Agriculture: Trần Thiện Vàng
 Minister of Health: Đặng Hữu Chí
 Minister of Public Works and Planning: Nguyễn Văn Tỷ
 Minister of Defense: Trần Quang Vinh
 Minister of the Vice President's Office: Đinh Xuân Quảng
 Secretary of State for Northern Vietnam: Nghiêm Xuân Thiện
 Secretary of State for Central Vietnam: Phan Văn Giáo
 Secretary of State for Southern Vietnam: Lê Văn Hoạch

See also 

 First Indochina War
 French Indochina
 History of Vietnam

Notes

References 

States and territories established in 1948
Former polities of the Indochina Wars
States and territories disestablished in 1949
Provisional Central Government of Vietnam
Provisional Central Government of Vietnam
Provisional Central Government of Vietnam
1948 establishments in Asia
1949 disestablishments in Asia
Provisional governments